Union Avenue Line may refer to:
Union Avenue Line (Baltimore)
Union Avenue Line (Brooklyn)